Taintnops is a genus of South American araneomorph spiders in the family Caponiidae, first described by Norman I. Platnick in 1994.  it contains only two species, both found in Chile.

References

Araneomorphae genera
Caponiidae
Spiders of South America
Endemic fauna of Chile